Coulsdon West was a ward in the London Borough of Croydon, covering part of the Coulsdon area of London in the United Kingdom. The ward formed part of Chris Philp MP's Croydon South constituency, which has one of the highest majority's for the Conservative Party in London. At the 2011 Census the population of the ward was 13,449.

The ward returned three councillors every four years to Croydon Council. At the 2006 Croydon Council election, Gavin Barwell, Brian Cakebread and David Osland were elected to the council. All of them were running as Conservative Party candidates. In the ward the Labour Party's highest ranking candidate got only 481 votes, one of the lowest for them in London.

Ward result

References

External links
Council Elections 2006 results - Coulsdon East
Conservative Councillors for Croydon.
 London Borough of Croydon map of wards.
Coulsdon West Residents' Association

Former wards of the London Borough of Croydon
2018 disestablishments in England